Marie Colardeau, born Marie Le Vigoureux de Kermorvan was a feminist and the first female lawyer from the French overseas territory of Réunion.

Biography
Marie Le Vigoureux gained her license in 1929, and in 1930 became the first female lawyer in Réunion. In 1937 she married the politician Fernand Colardeau.

See also
List of first women lawyers and judges in Africa

References

People from Réunion
Year of birth missing
Year of death missing
20th-century French lawyers
20th-century French women lawyers